Loasa is a genus of flowering plants in the family Loasaceae. The genus contains about 100 species native to Central and South America. Species of Loasa are prickly herbs or shrubs that have nettle-like stinging hairs. Some species of Loasa are grown as ornamental plants and are known as Chile nettle. Its flowers have five yellow petals covering united stamens and distinctive large coloured nectaries. Caiophora is a closely related genus that also has stinging hairs and is found on rocky slopes of the Andes.

Selected Species

Loasa acanthifolia 
Loasa acerifolia 
Loasa argentina 
Loasa arnottiana 
Loasa caespitosa 
Loasa elongata 
Loasa elongata 
Loasa filicifolia 
Loasa floribunda 
Loasa hastata 
Loasa heterophylla 
Loasa humilis 
Loasa illapelina 
Loasa incurva 
Loasa insons 
Loasa mollensis 
Loasa multifida 
Loasa nitida 
Loasa pallida 
Loasa paradoxa 
Loasa placei 
Loasa prostrata 
Loasa sclareifolia 
Loasa sigmoidea 
Loasa tricolor 
Loasa triloba 
Loasa unguiculata

References

 

Loasaceae
Cornales genera